Helen Knipe Carpenter (December 6, 1881 – February 15, 1959) was an illustrator and writer active in the early 20th century noted for her Art Nouveau illustrations and her adaptations of stage plays to novels.

Born Helen Alden Knipe on December 6, 1881, in Philadelphia, Pennsylvania, a granddaughter of the novelist T. S. Arthur, she studied at the Pennsylvania Academy of the Fine Arts under the tutelage of William Merritt Chase, Hugh Henry Brackenridge and Thomas Pollock Anshutz.

She married writer, playwright, and director Edward Childs Carpenter on June 1, 1907, in Philadelphia where they lived and worked for a number of years, summering in Connecticut.

Her works span the period from the late Art Nouveau period through the 1940s.

Works

 Illustrator

 Author

Carpenter died on February 15, 1959, in Litchfield, Connecticut. She and her husband Edward Childs Carpenter are interred in Town Hill Cemetery in New Hartford, Connecticut.

References

External links 

 
 

1881 births
1959 deaths
American children's book illustrators
People from Philadelphia
Novelists from Pennsylvania
20th-century American novelists